The Defence Services Staff College (DSSC) is a defence service training institution of the Ministry of Defence, Government of India.

It trains officers of all three services of the Indian Armed Forces – (Indian Army, Indian Navy, Indian Air Force), selected officers from the Paramilitary forces and the Civil Services and officers from friendly foreign countries for command and staff appointments.

History
One of the oldest military institutions in India, it was founded in 1905 as the Army Staff college in Deolali (near Nashik). In 1907, it moved to its permanent location at Quetta (now Pakistan). After the partition of India and Pakistan in 1947, the Indian elements of the Staff College, Quetta led by the senior-most Indian Army instructor Colonel S. D. Verma moved to India. Verma was promoted brigadier and appointed as the first commandant and chose Wellington Cantonment in The Nilgiris District of Tamil Nadu as the location of the Staff College in India.

The first staff course started in April 1948, months after the move. The first course had 46 officers from the Indian Army and 2 each from the Indian Navy and Indian Air Force. Two officers from this course – Major Tapishwar Narain Raina and Squadron Leader Hrushikesh Moolgavkar went on to head their services as the Chiefs. The air wing was established in 1949 and the Naval Wing in 1950 and the college was rechristened Defence Services Staff College. The college threw open its gates to officers from friendly foreign countries from the fifth course and to civil servants from the sixth course.

DSSC has been affiliated to Madras University for the award of M.Sc. degree in 'Defence and Strategic Studies' and recognized as a research centre for MPhil and PhD degrees since 1990.

Crest and motto

The Staff College when at Quetta adopted the crest of Staff College, Camberley, which was the 'Wise Owl' with the Latin motto . In 1964, Owl perched on crossed swords and the motto in Sanskrit  was adopted.

Commandant

The commandant of the Defence Services Staff College is the head of the institution. The commandant is an army officer of the rank of lieutenant general.

Organisation
The commandant of the college is assisted by the chief instructors (CI) of the army, naval and air wings, all two-star appointments. The CIs are drawn from the respective services. The Incharge of the administrative wing (also a two-star appointment), and the brigadier general staff (BGS) also report into the commandant.

Notable alumni

Chiefs of Army Staff
 Field Marshal Sam Manekshaw
 General P. P. Kumaramangalam
 General Tapishwar Narain Raina
 General Om Prakash Malhotra
 General Arun Shridhar Vaidya
 General K. V. Krishna Rao
 General Krishnaswamy Sundarji
 General Vishwa Nath Sharma
 General Sunith Francis Rodrigues
 General Bipin Chandra Joshi
 General Ved Prakash Malik
 General Sundararajan Padmanabhan
 General Nirmal Chander Vij
 General J. J. Singh
 General Deepak Kapoor
 General V. K. Singh
 General Bikram Singh
 General Bipin Rawat
 General Manoj Mukund Naravane

Chiefs of Naval Staff
 Admiral Ronald Lynsdale Pereira
 Admiral Oscar Stanley Dawson
 Admiral Jayant Ganpat Nadkarni
 Admiral Vishnu Bhagwat
 Admiral Sushil Kumar
 Admiral Madhvendra Singh
 Admiral Arun Prakash
 Admiral Sureesh Mehta
 Admiral Robin K. Dhowan
 Admiral Sunil Lanba
 Admiral Karambir Singh

Chiefs of Air Staff
 Air Chief Marshal Hrushikesh Moolgavkar
 Air Chief Marshal Idris Hasan Latif
 Air Chief Marshal Lakshman Madhav Katre
 Air Chief Marshal Surinder Mehra
 Air Chief Marshal S. K. Kaul
 Air Chief Marshal Satish Sareen
 Air Chief Marshal Anil Yashwant Tipnis
 Air Chief Marshal Srinivasapuram Krishnaswamy
 Air Chief Marshal Shashindra Pal Tyagi
 Air Chief Marshal Pradeep Vasant Naik
 Air Chief Marshal Arup Raha
 Air Chief Marshal Birender Singh Dhanoa

Foreign alumni
 Hans-Christoph Ammon, Head of German special forces  
 Muhammadu Buhari, President and former military Head of State, Nigeria
 Olusegun Obasanjo, former Nigerian President 
 Sitiveni Rabuka OBE, MSD, OStJ, 3rd Prime Minister of Fiji
 Lieutenant Colonel Gotabhaya Rajapaksa, RWP, RSP, GR – former President of Sri Lanka
 Major General Matheus Alueendo 7th Commander of the Namibian Army
 Admiral Basil Gunasekara, former commander of the Sri Lanka Navy

See also
 Pakistan Command and Staff College
 Indian National Defence University
 Military Academies in India
 Sainik school

References

External links
 

Education in Nilgiris district
Staff colleges
Military academies of India
Educational institutions established in 1905
1905 establishments in India
Colleges affiliated to University of Madras
Defence Services Staff College